The General Aviation PJ was a flying boat produced in the United States in the 1930s as a search-and-rescue aircraft for the Coast Guard.

Design 
Originally designated FLB (for "Flying Life Boat"), it was a conventional high-wing cantilever monoplane with a flying boat hull and outrigger pontoons mounted on the wings slightly outboard of mid-span. The twin pusher engines were carried in separate nacelles on pylons above the wings. The hull was a monocoque metal structure, and the wing was a wooden structure skinned with plywood. The basic design was based on that of the Fokker F.11, but substantially enlarged (Fokker's American operation was renamed General Aviation after purchase by General Motors in 1930). While not a true amphibian and able to land on dry land, the PJ was equipped with retractable undercarriage that functioned as its own, self-carrying beaching trolley.

Five examples were operated by the US Coast Guard during the 1930s, named Antares, Altair, Acrux, Acamar, and Arcturus (hull numbers FLB-51 through FLB-55). In 1933, Antares underwent a major refit that included a redesign of her engine nacelles, converting these to tractor configuration.

Variants

 PJ-1 - original version with pusher engines (five built)
 PJ-2 - version with tractor engines (one converted)

Specifications (PJ-1)

References
 General Aviation PJ-1/2
 Bowers, Peter M. United States Navy Aircraft since 1911. Annapolis, Maryland, USA: Naval Institute Press, 1990, p. 495. .

External links

 "Flying Lifeboats." Popular Science, December 1937, pp. 56–57, all photos show PJ-1 except for middle aircraft p. 57 an RD-2.

1930s United States military rescue aircraft
Flying boats
Atlantic Aircraft aircraft
High-wing aircraft
Twin-engined pusher aircraft
Aircraft first flown in 1933